William Childs may refer to:

William Childs (restaurateur), co-founder of Childs Restaurants
William Macbride Childs (1869–1939), academic and historian
William Harold Joseph Childs, British physicist and academic author
Billy Childs (William Edward Childs, born 1957), musician
William Childs (boxer), British boxer
William Childs House, in the National Register of Historic Places listings in Riverside County, California

See also
William Child (disambiguation)
George William Childs (1829–1894), US publisher